The Peruvian wren (Cinnycerthia peruana) is a species of bird in the family Troglodytidae. It is endemic Peru.

Taxonomy and systematics

What is now the Peruvian wren was formerly called sepia-brown wren and at that time included as subspecies what are now the species Cinnycerthia olivascens and C. fulva.  Confusingly, after the split the name sepia-brown wren was transferred to C. olivascens by the International Ornithological Committee (IOC), but the South American Classification Committee of the American Ornithological Society (SACC/AOS) and the Clements taxonomy call it Sharpe's wren. C. fulva is named fulvous wren.

The Peruvian wren is monotypic.

Description

The adults' upperparts are rich chestnut, with the crown and rump being redder. They have a variable amount of white on the face. The tail is also rich chestnut and has narrow black bars. The chin and throat are orange-brown and the chest, belly, and flanks are the same hue but darker. The juvenile is believed to resemble the adult but with no white on the face.

Distribution and habitat

The Peruvian wren is found in the Andes of Peru between the departments of Amazonas and Ayacucho. It inhabits wet montane forest, secondary forest, and their edges.

Behavior

Feeding

The Peruvian wren forages in groups that appear to be extended families. It usually feeds on or near the ground in vegetation and litter, but its diet has not been documented.

Breeding

The Peruvian wren appears to have a protracted breeding season, base on the dates that occupied nests, newly hatched chicks, and fledglings have been observed. One nest has been described; it was a pouch with a down-facing entrance tunnel, constructed of rootlets, moss, and bamboo leaves, and suspended from a bamboo stem.

Vocalization

Peruvian wren pairs often sing in duet, "a magnificent series of rich trills and clear whistles" . Its call is "a gravelly, chattering 'ch-d-d-d'" .

Status

The IUCN has assessed the Peruvian wren as being of Least Concern. It is "[q]uite common in suitable habitat in parts of its range" but
its "population is suspected to be in decline owing to ongoing habitat destruction and fragmentation."

References

Peruvian wren
Birds of the Peruvian Andes
Endemic birds of Peru
Peruvian wren
Taxonomy articles created by Polbot